Yuri Valeryevich Baskakov (born May 10, 1964, in Moscow) is a former Russian football referee. He refereed games in Champions League and the Russian Premier League.

He oversaw the Champions League quarter-final in 2007 between Bayern Munich.

External links
Profile

Russian football referees
1964 births
Living people